Dovenby  is a village and former civil parish, now in the parish of Bridekirk, in the Allerdale district, in the county of Cumbria, England. In 1931 the parish had a population of 163.

Etymology
'Dovenby' is 'Dufan's bȳ' or 'Dufan's hamlet or village'. 'Bȳ' is late Old English, from Old Norse 'býr'. The personal name 'Dufan' "is of Irish origin (OIr 'Dubhán'), a diminutive of 'dubh', 'black', but it is on record from Iceland."

Governance
Dovenby is part of the Workington constituency for UK parliament. The current Member of Parliament for the Workington constituency is Mark Jenkinson who is a member of the Conservative Party. The Labour Party had won the seat in the constituency in every general election since 1979. The Conservative Party had only been elected once in Workington since World War 2, at the 1976 election.

For Local Government purposes it's in the Broughton St Bridget's electoral ward of Allerdale Borough Council. This ward stretches north to Bridekirk with a total population at the 2011 Census of 4,178. Dovenby is part of the Dearham and Broughton Ward of Cumbria County Council.

For Parish Council purposes Dovenby belongs to Bridekirk Parish Council, along with the villages of Tallentire and Bridekirk.

Dovenby was formerly a township in Bridekirk parish, from 1866 Dovenby was a civil parish in its own right until it was abolished on 1 April 1934 and merged with Bridekirk.

Dovenby Hall

The oldest part of the estate is a 13th century peel tower. The main house was built for Sir Thomas Lamplugh in the 16th century and, after the house came into the ownership of the Dykes family in about 1800, it was remodelled for the Ballentine-Dykes family in the early 19th century.

The house was acquired by the local authorities from Colonel Ballantine-Dykes for use as a mental hospital in 1930. Following the closure of the hospital, it was bought by Malcolm Wilson, a former rally driver, in January 1998 and, after a major refurbishment, then became home to Ford's World Rally Championship team.

M-Sport

Dovenby is the headquarters of M-Sport the auto racing team.

Notable people
Malcolm Wilson (born 1956), rally driver and rally-team owner
Matthew Wilson  (born 29 January 1987), rally driver

See also
Listed buildings in Bridekirk

References

External links

   Cumbria County History Trust: Dovenby

Villages in Cumbria
Former civil parishes in Cumbria
Bridekirk